This is a list of songs by Scottish alternative rock group Travis. The band have released eight studio albums since their formation in 1995. This list does not contain live versions or remixes released by the band.

Original songs

Note: All singles released by Travis before 2004 appeared on the album Singles.

Covers
The cover versions listed here have been released as a b-side on a single release. All other cover versions performed by Travis have been excluded from this list.

External links
Official Travis website

Travis
 
Travis